This is the list of cities and towns in Serbia, according to the criteria used by Statistical Office of the Republic of Serbia, which classifies the settlements into urban and rural, depending not only on size, but also on other administrative and legal criteria. Also villages with the municipal rights have been added to the list.

Organization
Cities
Cities in administrative sense are defined by the Law on Territorial Organization. The territory with the city status usually has more than 100,000 inhabitants, but is otherwise very similar to municipality. They enjoy a special status of autonomy and self-government, as they have their own civic parliaments and executive branches, as well as mayor is elected through popular vote, elected by their citizens in local elections. Also, the presidents of the municipalities are often referred to as "mayors" in everyday usage. There are 29 cities, each having an assembly and budget of its own.

As with a municipality, the territory of a city is composed of a city proper and surrounding villages (e.g. the territory of the City of Subotica is composed of the Subotica town and surrounding villages). The capital Belgrade is the only city on the level of a district. All other cities are on the municipality level and are part of a district.

City municipalities
The city may or may not be divided into city municipalities. Five cities (Belgrade, Niš, Požarevac, Vranje and Užice) comprise several city municipalities. Competences of cities and city municipalities are divided. The city municipalities of these six cities also have their assemblies and other prerogatives. The largest city municipality by number of residents is New Belgrade (214,506 inhabitants).

The city of Kragujevac had its own city municipalities from 2002 until 2008, when they were abolished. Novi Sad used to be formally divided into city municipalities of Novi Sad and Petrovaradin, but in March 2019 a new city statute was adopted, abolishing any separate municipalities. In 2013, the city municipality of Sevojno within the city of Užice was established.

List of the cities
The following cities have official administrative city rights:

  Belgrade
  Bor
  Čačak
  Jagodina
  Kikinda
  Kraljevo
  Kragujevac
  Kruševac
  Leskovac
  Loznica
  Novi Pazar
  Novi Sad
  Niš
  Pančevo
  Pirot
  Požarevac
  Prokuplje
  Smederevo
  Sombor
  Sremska Mitrovica
  Subotica
  Šabac
  Užice
  Valjevo
  Vranje
  Vršac
  Zaječar
  Zrenjanin

List of cities and municipalities
This is a list of cities and municipalities (excluding city municipalities) in Serbia, as defined by the Law on territorial organisation The data on population is taken from the 2011 census.

It does not include municipalities in Kosovo created by the UNMIK after 1999. The census was not conducted in Kosovo, which was under administration of UNMIK, so the population numbers are not given for the municipalities in Kosovo.

According to the statistic criteria, the settlements in the table are classified as "urban" (i.e. cities and towns), as opposed to "rural" (villages). These criteria are not limited to the settlement size, but also include the percentage of residents engaged in agriculture, population density etc. Thus, not all towns in statistical sense are greater than villages, and they are not always municipality centers. Note that the population of the city municipalities of some cities were not presented as unique, but united in the city population.

Cities and municipalities

Bold: Cities in administrative sense

Cities and municipalities in Kosovo

See also
 Administrative divisions of Serbia
 Districts of Serbia
 Municipalities and cities of Serbia
 Cities, towns and villages in Vojvodina
 Populated places in Serbia
 List of cities in Kosovo

Notes and references

Notes
The city of Belgrade consists of 17 city municipalities.
The city of Novi Sad consists of two city municipalities: Novi Sad and Petrovaradin.
The city of Niš consists of five city municipalities: Medijana, Palilula, Pantelej, Crveni Krst and Niška Banja.
The city of Vranje consists of two city municipalities: City municipality of Vranje and Vranjska Banja.
The city of Užice consists of two city municipalities: City municipality of Užice and Sevojno
The city of Požarevac consists of two city municipalities: City municipality of Požarevac and Kostolac.

References

External links

Serbia
Cities
Serbia